is a trans-Neptunian object and retrograde damocloid on a highly eccentric, cometary-like orbit. It was first observed on 3 June 2006 by the Mount Lemmon Survey at the Mount Lemmon Observatory in Arizona, United States.

Orbit 
The orbit of  has a high eccentricity of 0.88 and a semi-major axis of 32.2 AU. Its perihelion distance is 3.7 AU from the Sun and its aphelion distance is 60.7 AU. Its orbit is inclined 172 degrees to the ecliptic plane, meaning that it orbits the Sun in a retrograde (backwards) motion compared to the planets in the Solar System. Because of 's highly eccentric and inclined orbit, it is classified as a damocloid, a group of minor planets with long period comet-like orbits.

References

External links 
 

Trans-Neptunian objects
Damocloids
Minor planet object articles (unnumbered)
Astronomical objects discovered in 2006
Lost minor planets
Minor planets with a retrograde orbit